ToyZ is the second and final studio album by German glam rock band Cinema Bizarre. After their debut album, Final Attraction was a moderate hit, they began working on their second studio album. The first single from the album is called "I Came 2 Party," featuring Space Cowboy. Originally the first single was to be a song entitled "My Obsession," however this release was canceled due to fans taking advantage of a mistake on the part of iTunes. When the single was put up two days too early, fans were able to download the track and the song quickly spread, resulting in an announcement from the band that "I Came 2 Party" would be released instead. The album release date was also postponed until mid-August. "My Obsession" was later released as the second single from the album.

Singles
"I Came 2 Party" was confirmed to be the first single from the album, in the place of previously announced single "My Obsession." "I Came 2 Party" released in Europe on August 7, 2009, and on August 11, worldwide. "My Obsession" was eventually released as the album's second single.

Track listing

Standard Edition

Deluxe edition

In addition to the tracks above, the deluxe edition also features a bonus disc containing the following songs:

Charts

Release history

Promotion
Cinema Bizarre was playing European shows on their "We're All ToyZ" tour to promote the album. However, in January 2010, the band announced that it was discontinuing work as Cinema Bizarre.

References

2009 albums
Cinema Bizarre albums